This is a list of submissions to the 59th Academy Awards for Best Foreign Language Film. The Academy Award for Best Foreign Language Film was created in 1956 by the Academy of Motion Picture Arts and Sciences to honour non-English-speaking films produced outside the United States. The award is handed out annually, and is accepted by the winning film's director, although it is considered an award for the submitting country as a whole. Countries are invited by the Academy to submit their best films for competition according to strict rules, with only one film being accepted from each country.

For the 59th Academy Awards, thirty-two films were submitted in the category Academy Award for Best Foreign Language Film. The five nominated films came from Austria, Canada, Czechoslovakia, France and the eventual winner, The Assault, from the Netherlands. Austria and Canada were nominated for the first time and Puerto Rico submitted a film for consideration for the first time.

Submissions

References

59